Leon Higgins (born 27 June 1968) is a former Australian rules footballer who played with the Sydney Swans and Hawthorn in the Australian Football League (AFL). 

A red headed left footer, he was usually seen at the half forward line. 

He represented New South Wales against Queensland at the Sydney Cricket Ground, 12 May 1992.

Higgins played 79 games with the Wodonga Football Club, debuting with them in 1999. 

Before playing league football he played at Tocumwal, a club which he went onto coach in 2005 and 2006. winning the club best and fairest award in 2005. 

Higgins coached the Victorian Country Under 16 side in 2015.

Higgins coached the Murray Bushrangers in the NAB League for three seasons from 2016 to 2018.

References

External links

1968 births
Living people
Australian rules footballers from New South Wales
Sydney Swans players
Hawthorn Football Club players
New South Wales Australian rules football State of Origin players